Główna may refer to the following places in Poland:

 Główna, Greater Poland Voivodeship
 Główna, Pomeranian Voivodeship
 Główna, a district and stream in Nowe Miasto, Poznań

See also